Matthew Green was the technical director of the Turks and Caicos Islands Football Association since  replacing Paul Crosbie in 2004.

Biography
Green graduated from the University of Hull in 1995 with a BA in History. In 1998, he completed his PGCE and moved to the Bahamas to take up a teaching position at Temple Christian High School. Within a few years he turned the school into one of the major power houses in Bahamian football as his school programme soon became the most progressive and active in the country. His senior high girls team won the BAISS championship from 2001 until 2007 and were undefeated during this time. His boys team could not quite match this success as they lost in four championship finals during this time. Green also started his own women's clubs called Revolution FC which won four league titles and three cup competitions. Before leaving the Bahamas Green was manager of the FC Nassau women's team which won both the WFL league and cup titles. Green was also player manager for the FC Nassau men's team which won the NFL 2 title in 2006. Whilst in the Bahamas Green played for a variety of teams in the National Football League and was the leading goal scorer in the league for Grasshoppers FC in the 1999-2000 and 2000-2001 season. He repeated this feat for East End FC in the 2002-2003 season.

Whilst Technical Director of the TCIFA he made history as the Men's National Team, under his guidance won their first ever World Cup Qualifying game with a 2-1 win against St. Lucia, taking them up to their highest FIFA ranking of 154. For several years Green's tenure witnessed a huge surge in popularity of the sport as he developed the game at all levels, noticeably youth and women's football. Green was also a strong supporter of Beach Soccer and the TCIFA became the first Caribbean Association to have senior Men / Women and Youth leagues. Green's National Women's team also saw success with their first ever international win with a 4-0 victory over the British Virgin islands in 2009. Green returned to the UK in 2014 where he returned to teaching at Sirius Academy School.

In August 2018, Green moved to Surabaya in Indonesia where he has taken up a teaching post at the Surabaya European School, a position which has allowed him an opportunity to set up a football and basketball programme at the school.
He currently teaches Humanities: History, Global Perspectives and Geography as well as organises the MUN society.

References 

Year of birth missing (living people)
Living people
English football managers
Turks and Caicos Islands national football team managers
British emigrants to the Bahamas
Alumni of the University of Hull
Expatriate football managers in the Turks and Caicos Islands